Julián Alvear or Julián Alvera was a Roman Catholic prelate who served as Auxiliary Bishop of Toledo (1631).

Biography
In 1631, Julián Alvear was appointed during the papacy of Pope Urban VIII as Auxiliary Bishop of Toledo and Titular Bishop of Siriensis. While bishop, he was the principal co-consecrator of Domingo Pimentel Zúñiga, Bishop of Osma (1631).

See also
Catholic Church in Spain

References

17th-century Roman Catholic bishops in Spain
Bishops appointed by Pope Urban VIII